CCGS Samuel Risley is a Canadian Coast Guard icebreaker and buoy tender assigned to the Great Lakes area (Central and Arctic Region). Lead ship of her class, the vessel is named after Samuel Risley, the 19th century maritime inspector and first head of Board of Steamship Inspectors for Upper Canada and Ontario. Based in the Great Lakes, CCGS Samuel Risley is responsible for keeping an ice-free passage between Port Colborne, Ontario and Thunder Bay, Ontario.

Design and description
The design of the vessel is based on offshore supply-tugboat designs, with strengthened chines. The vessel has a tall foredeck, and a long low quarterdeck, for carrying buoys, where a crane with a capability of lifting  is permanently mounted. The crane is motion stabilized.

The ship is powered by four Wärtsilä Vasa 12V22 12-cylinder geared Diesel Engines driving two controllable pitch propellers that create . The ship is equipped with one Detroit Diesel 6–71 emergency generator.

The vessel is equipped with two Racal Decca navigational radars using the "X" and "S" band. The vessel has a complement of 22, with 9 officers and 13 crew.

Operational history
Ordered in 1983, the ship was launched in 1984 by Vito Steel Boat & Barge Limited at their yard in Delta, British Columbia with the yard number 161. The vessel was completed on 4 April 1985. After completion, the ship sailed to eastern Canada, transiting the Panama Canal and deploying to the Great Lakes. The ship is assigned to the Central Region, based at Parry Sound, Ontario.

In January 2015, Samuel Risley and  worked to free several ships that had become icebound on the St. Clair River. In April, Samuel Risley was one of four icebreakers sent to rescue ten commercial vessels trapped in ice near Whitefish Point, Michigan.

In June 2016 Samuel Risley underwent a major refit by Newdock – St. John's Dockyard Ltd. Work. The cost of the contract was $3.6 million CAN. The refit involved the replacement of the bow thruster, a crane overhaul and recoating of the hull, along with a renovation of the galley and inspections. On 28 December 2017, Samuel Risley, in concert with the United States Coast Guard vessel , freed the lakers  and  that had become stuck in the ice on the St. Marys River below Sault Ste. Marie, Ontario the day before. Samuel Risley made its maiden voyage to the Arctic Ocean during the 2018 sailing season, leaving Quebec on 11 July 2018. The vessel took part in the annual resupply of the United States air station at Thule, Greenland. 

In February 2022, Samuel Risley was deployed to Lake Huron to search for debris on an unknown object that was shot down over the Great Lakes by the United States Air Force.

References

Notes

Citations

Sources

External links 

 Official CCGS site for the Samuel Risley.
 An extensive unofficial site, with many pictures.

Samuel Risley-class light icebreakers
Ships built in British Columbia
1985 ships